Chiaramonte are a noble family of Sicily.

Chiaramonte may also refer to:

People with the surname 
 Andrea Chiaramonte, (died 1392), Sicilian nobleman
Costanza Chiaramonte (c. 1377–1423), wife of the King Ladislaus of Naples
 Frank Chiaramonte (1942–1983), Cuban-American comic book artist 
 Giuseppe Chiaramonte (born 1976), retired American professional baseball catcher
 Isabella di Chiaramonte, also known as Isabella of Taranto (c. 1424–1465), first Queen consort of Ferdinand I of Naples
 Julio Chiaramonte (1915–1983), American Lieutenant Colonel of US Army
 Manfredi Chiaramonte (died 1391), Sicilian nobleman

Other 
 Chiaramonte Gulfi, town and comune in the province of Ragusa, Sicily, southern Italy
 Palazzo Chiaramonte, historical palace in Palermo, Sicily, southern Italy